Chorlton-by-Backford is a former civil parish, now in the parish of Backford, in Cheshire West and Chester, England. It contains four buildings that are recorded in the National Heritage List for England as designated listed buildings, all of which are at Grade II.  This grade is the lowest of the three gradings given to listed buildings and is applied to "buildings of national importance and special interest".  The parish is entirely rural, and the listed buildings are all domestic or related to farming.

See also
Listed buildings in Ellesmere Port
Listed buildings in Little Stanney
Listed buildings in Stoak
Listed buildings in Croughton
Listed buildings in Wervin
Listed buildings in Mickle Trafford
Listed buildings in Upton-by-Chester
Listed buildings in Capenhurst

References
Citations

Sources

Listed buildings in Cheshire West and Chester
Lists of listed buildings in Cheshire